Archibald Howard Cullen (24 September 188716 June 1968) was the sixth Bishop of Grahamstown.

Early life and education
He was born on 24 September 1887 to William and Louisa (née Howard). He was baptized in the Parish of St Jude, Peckham on 20 Nov 1887. His father was a Printer's Reader. Cullen was educated at Simon Langton Grammar School for Boys.

Ordained ministry
Ordained in 1916, his first post was a curacy in Coalbrookdale. During World War I he was a Temporary Chaplain to the Forces(TCF). He was interviewed for a commission in the army chaplaincy in May, 1916. Unusually, he was still a deacon but was 29 years old, had spent four years working for the YMCA, and could speak French and German? He was described by the Deputy Chaplain-General as 'not v. strong' and in the summer of 1918 was given leave because of headaches and sleeplessness. He had served in France with the 1st South African General Hospital. When peace returned he was vicar of Umzinto in the Diocese of Natal, he later became chaplain and lecturer of Wells Theological College and then Vice-Principal of Leeds Clergy School. In 1926 he became warden of St Paul's Theological College, Grahamstown until his appointment to the episcopate in 1931.

Later life
He died on 16 June 1968. in South Africa.

References

External links 

 
 University of the Witwatersrand

1887 births
People educated at Simon Langton Grammar School for Boys
Alumni of Queens' College, Cambridge
20th-century Anglican Church of Southern Africa bishops
Anglican bishops of Grahamstown
1968 deaths
World War I chaplains
Royal Army Chaplains' Department officers